The Pasadena International House of Prayer (PIHOP) is a prayer center in Pasadena, California. It is a branch of the charismatic movement and the mission organization International House of Prayer.

According to its website, its goal is to provide a place for Christians from around the region to gather to cultivate intimacy with Christ. On top of the affirmation of Apostles' Creed, the PIHOP believes in prophetic prayer and healing.

Cheryl Allen is the current director of the PIHOP.

Lawsuit
In September 2010, the IHOP corporation sued PIHOP, alleging trademark infringement. IHOP dropped the lawsuit in December 2010.

References

External links
 Official Site

Evangelical churches in California
Charismatic and Pentecostal organizations
Prayer